The Jheel Park or Society Jheel Park, is situated near Tariq Road in P.E.C.H Society, Karachi, Sindh, Pakistan.

Gallery

See also 
 List of parks and gardens in Pakistan
 List of parks and gardens in Lahore
 List of parks and gardens in Karachi

References

External links
Jheel Park Map on Wikimapia
Jheel Park Photo on Panoramio

Parks in Karachi
Nature parks in Pakistan